Grosse Isle is a small rural community  north-west of Winnipeg, Manitoba. It is partially in the Rural Municipality of Rosser and partially in the Rural Municipality of Rockwood. The name of Grosse Isle comes from the French "Grosse Île", meaning big island.

History
The name comes from early French hunters, who gave the area its name as it was a large tract of wooded land, surrounded by a swamp. The name was reinforced during the 1852 flood, when people fleeing from the floodwaters sought refuge here, on "the island". A Canadian National railway point was established here in 1904.

Attractions
Grosse Isle is the seasonal destination of the Prairie Dog Central Railway. It is an attraction that brings people into the community from the area and from Winnipeg.

Grosse Isle has a heritage site with a school, train station, church, prairie home, a caboose and picnic spaces.

Filming
In 2014, the Western TV show The Pinkertons was filmed in Grosse Isle.

References 

Unincorporated communities in Manitoba